Tsz Wan West is one of the 25 constituencies in the Wong Tai Sin District in Hong Kong.

The constituency returns one district councillor to the Wong Tai Sin District Council, with an election every four years. The seat has been currently held by Yuen Kwok-keung of the Democratic Alliance for the Betterment and Progress of Hong Kong since 2011.

Tsz Wan West constituency is loosely based on the Tsz Lok Estate in Tsz Wan Shan with an estimated population of 20,405.

Councillors represented

Election results

2010s

2000s

1990s

References

Tsz Wan Shan
Constituencies of Hong Kong
Constituencies of Wong Tai Sin District Council
1999 establishments in Hong Kong
Constituencies established in 1999